The 1980–81 New Jersey Nets season was the Nets' fifth season in the NBA. It was their final season of play at the Rutgers Athletic Center in Piscataway, as the team moved to Brendan Byrne Arena in the Meadowlands for the following season.

Draft picks

Roster

Regular season

Season standings

Record vs. opponents

Game log

Player statistics

Awards and records

Transactions

References

See also
 1980–81 NBA season

New Jersey Nets season
New Jersey Nets seasons
New Jersey Nets
New Jersey Nets
Piscataway, New Jersey